Lixus pulverulentus is a species of weevil belonging to the family Curculionidae. The species was scientifically described in 1763 by Giovanni Antonio Scopoli as Curculio pulverulentus Scopoli, 1763.

Distribution
This widespread, but quite rare species can be found in southern and central Europe (including the Iberian Peninsula), from Iran to Asia Minor and in the Mediterranean Basin, including North Africa and the Middle East

Hastings Country Park produced the last British records of this species and it is now considered to no longer breed in Britain.

Description

These rather long weevils have a narrow, elongated body. The conically shaped pronotum is hardly granular. They are dusted yellowish to brownish.

Biology
The beetles appear in April. They are mainly seen in May and June. Larvae of these polyphagous beetles  mainly develop in the stems of Malvaceae, Asteraceae, and Fabaceae (Alcea rosea, Malva pusilla, Malva sylvestris. Malva thuringiaca.Cirsium arvense, Cirsium palustre, Cirsium serrulatum,  Carduus acanthoides, Silybum marianum, Centaurea nigra, Onopordum acanthium, Vicia faba, etc.) Pupation also takes place in the stems. The beetles hibernate in the dried stems or in the soil.

References

Lixinae
Beetles of Europe
Beetles described in 1763